Neoantrodia infirma is a species of fungus belonging to the family Fomitopsidaceae.

References

Fomitopsidaceae
Fungi described in 1992